Hilton Edward Buckney (5 June 1910 – 27 September 1987) was an Australian Rules footballer from Tasmania who played in the 1920s and 1930s. He played with the Lefroy Football Club in the TFL for most of his career and captained his state at the 1933 Sydney Carnival.

In 1932 Buckney played 11 games for Hawthorn in the VFL and kicked three goals. He debuted in Round 4 versus Carlton at Princes Park.

References

Holmesby, Russell and Main, Jim (2011). The Encyclopedia of AFL Footballers. 9th ed. Melbourne: Bas Publishing.

1910 births
Lefroy Football Club players
Hawthorn Football Club players
Australian rules footballers from Tasmania
1987 deaths